"Immortal" is a song by American rapper J. Cole, released on December 9, 2016 from his fourth studio album, 4 Your Eyez Only.

Background
The song was recorded at the Sheltuh in North Carolina and Electric Lady Studios in New York City. The song was produced by Cardiak, Frank Dukes with additional production from J. Cole. "Immortal" also features background vocals from Kay Foxx.

Critical reception
The track was generally well-received from critics. Paul A. Thompson of Pitchfork compared the song to 2Pac saying Cole "comes to life on “Immortal,” which sounds as if someone played Cole an unheard 2Pac song from the Makaveli sessions and then dared him to recreate it from memory. The song’s narrator feeds baggies through a burglar bar, watches Bic lighters wave under spoons, wakes up early to hit the Bowflex. It’s details like that last one that set “Immortal” apart from so much of Cole’s early work: you can see the speaker bathed in the artificial light of 3 a.m. infomercials, figuring he needs to put some weight on."

Commercial performance
Upon its first week of release, "Immortal" debuted at number 11 on the US Billboard Hot 100, which marks as one of his highest charting positions to date, and at number 6 on the US Hot R&B/Hip-Hop Songs chart.

Charts

Certifications

References

2016 songs
J. Cole songs
Songs written by J. Cole
Songs written by Frank Dukes
Songs written by Cardiak